Amjad Hussain B. Sial is a Pakistani diplomat who served  SAARC Secretary General from March 2017 to February 2020.

Education
Sial received a master's degree in Defence and Strategic Studies from National Defence University, Pakistan.

Career
On 1 March 2017, he replaced Arjun Bahadur Thapa and assumed the office of SAARC Secretary General. Before becoming SAARC Secretary General, he was special secretary at Ministry of Foreign Affairs.

He had served as the ambassador to Tajikistan from 2011 to 2014 and permanent representative of Pakistan to the United Nations.

References 

Year of birth missing (living people)
Living people
Secretaries General of the South Asian Association for Regional Cooperation
Ambassadors of Pakistan to Tajikistan